Alexander Stuart Walker (August 18, 1826 – August 14, 1896) was a justice of the Supreme Court of Texas from April 1888 to January 1889.

References

Justices of the Texas Supreme Court
1826 births
1896 deaths
19th-century American judges